Kristie Ahn was the defending champion, but decided not to participate this year.

Francesca Di Lorenzo won the title, defeating Erin Routliffe 6–4, 6–1 in the final.

Seeds

Draw

Finals

Top half

Bottom half

References
Main Draw

Winnipeg National Bank Challenger
Winnipeg Challenger